Roderick Duchâtelet (born 1972) is a Belgian businessman, the current president of Újpest FC. His father, Roland Duchâtelet, is the seventh richest man in Belgium.

Business activities 
On 19 October 2011, Roderick purchased the 95% of stakes of the Hungarian association football club Újpest FC. Roderick was the director and stakeholder of Germinal Beerschot until 2010.

Family 
Duchâtelet's wife, Valérie Gys, is the financial director of the Újpest FC. His father, Roland Duchâtelet was the stakeholder of Standard de Liège.

Current clubs owned by the Duchâtelet family
 Újpest (since 2011)
 Carl Zeiss Jena (since 2013)

Former clubs
 AD Alcorcón (2014-2019)
 Charlton Athletic (2014–2020)

References 

Újpest FC
Living people
1972 births
Belgian businesspeople